Old Harbor (Alutiiq: Nuniaq) is a city in Kodiak Island Borough, Alaska, United States. At the 2010 census the population was 218, down from 237 in 2000.

Geography

History

The community of Old Harbor has its origins in the era of Russian conquest. On August 14, 1784, Grigory Shelikhov with 130 Russian fur traders massacred (see Awa'uq Massacre) several hundred Qik’rtarmiut Sugpiat tribe of Alutiiq men, women and children at Refuge Rock, a tiny stack island off the eastern coast of Sitkalidak Island. In Alutiiq, this sacred place is known as Awa'uq ("to become numb").

Demographics

Old Harbor first appeared on the 1880 U.S. Census as an unincorporated village with 160 residents: 155 Inuit and 5 Creole (Mixed Russian and Native). It returned with 86 residents in 1890, all Native. It did not return again until 1920. It formally incorporated in 1966.

As of the census of 2000, there were 237 people, 79 households, and 51 families residing in the city. The racial makeup of the city was 13.08% White, 73.00% Native American, and 13.92% from two or more races.

There were 79 households, out of which 44.3% had children under the age of 18 living with them, 32.9% were married couples living together, 13.9% had a female householder with no husband present, and 34.2% were non-families. 26.6% of all households were made up of individuals, and 3.8% had someone living alone who was 65 years of age or older. The average household size was 3.00 and the average family size was 3.60.

In the city, the age distribution of the population showed 39.7% under the age of 18, 7.6% from 18 to 24, 29.5% from 25 to 44, 19.0% from 45 to 64, and 4.2% who were 65 years of age or older. The median age was 27 years. For every 100 females, there were 127.9 males. For every 100 females of age 18 and over, there were 142.4 males.

The median income for a household in the city was $32,500, and the median income for a family was $26,000. Males had a median income of $33,750 versus $23,750 for females. The per capita income for the city was $14,265. About 30.8% of families and 29.5% of the population were below the poverty line, including 32.5% of those under the age of eighteen and none of those 65 or over.

Economy
The Old Harbor Alliance has an economic plan for the community.

Education
The Old Harbor School, a K-12 rural school, is operated by the Kodiak Island Borough School District.

References

External links
 Kodiak.org  – Information about Old Harbor

Cities in Alaska
Cities in Kodiak Island Borough, Alaska
Populated coastal places in Alaska on the Pacific Ocean